The 3rd Race of Champions was a non-Championship motor race, run to Formula One rules, held on 17 March 1968 at Brands Hatch circuit in Kent, England. The race was run over 50 laps of the circuit, and was dominated by Bruce McLaren in a McLaren M7A.

Results

References 
 Results at Silhouet.com 
 Results at F1 Images.de 

Race of Champions
Race of Champions (Brands Hatch)
Race of Champions
Gold
Race of Champions